Jorge Clemente (born 24 March 1946) is a Puerto Rican boxer. He competed in the men's light heavyweight event at the 1968 Summer Olympics. At the 1968 Summer Olympics, he lost to Stanisław Dragan of Poland.

References

1946 births
Living people
Puerto Rican male boxers
Olympic boxers of Puerto Rico
Boxers at the 1968 Summer Olympics
People from Carolina, Puerto Rico
Light-heavyweight boxers